Fatjon Topi (born 24 December 1982) is an Albanian footballer who most recently played as a defender for KF Osumi in the Albanian Second Division.

References

1982 births
Living people
Sportspeople from Lushnjë
Association football defenders
Albanian footballers
KS Lushnja players
KF Çlirimi players
FK Tomori Berat players
Kategoria Superiore players
Kategoria e Parë players
Kategoria e Dytë players
Kategoria e Tretë players